Sparkling Shiraz is an Australian wine style. Before the enforcement of appellations d'origine contrôlée, the style was called Sparkling Burgundy.
 
The wine begins as a Shiraz on its first fermentation. Its secondary fermentation takes place in its bottle, or méthode champenoise.

The Sparkling Shiraz style has been described as "uniquely Australian".

References

Australian wine
Sparkling wines